The 2011 CONCACAF U-17 Championship took place in February 2011. Each national association selected 20 players who were born on or after 1 January 1994.

Group A

Costa Rica

Head coach: Luis Diego Arnaez

El Salvador

Head coach: Victor Manuel Pacheco

Haiti

Head coach: Wilner Etienne

Group B

Cuba

Head coach: Israel Blake

Panama

Head coach: Jorge Dely Valdés

United States

Head coach: Wilmer Cabrera

Group C

Guatemala

Head coach: Gary Stempel

Jamaica

Head coach: Wendell Downswell

Trinidad and Tobago

Head coach: Shawn Cooper

Group D

Barbados

Head coach: Kenville Layne

Canada

Head coach: Sean Fleming

Honduras

Head coach: Eugenio Emilio Umanzor

References

2011 squads
squads